William English (August 27, 1925 – March 4, 2007) was an American jazz drummer.

Early life 
English played early in his career with rhythm and blues musicians in the 1950s, including Sonny Thompson and Amos Milburn. He then worked with Julian Dash, Bennie Green, and Erskine Hawkins in the mid-1950s before becoming a house drummer at New York's Apollo Theatre. Late in the 1950s he worked with his own ensemble, and in the 1960s played with Earl Hines, Prestige Blues Swingers, Gene Ammons, Quincy Jones, Joe Newman, Stanley Turrentine, Kenny Burrell, and Eddie Jefferson. He remained active into the 1970s, working with Eric Dixon among others.

References
Footnotes

General references
Barry Kernfeld, "Bill English". The New Grove Dictionary of Jazz. 2nd edition, 2004.

1925 births
2007 deaths
American jazz drummers
Musicians from New York City
Jazz musicians from New York (state)